Beyyazı is a town (belde) and municipality in the Afyonkarahisar District, Afyonkarahisar Province, Turkey. Its population is 3,276 (2021).

References

Populated places in Afyonkarahisar District
Towns in Turkey